Hibbertia vestita, commonly known as hairy guinea-flower, is a species of flowering plant in the family Dilleniaceae and is endemic to eastern Australia. It is a small shrub with foliage covered with simple hairs, usually linear leaves, and yellow flowers with 22 to 43 stamens with many staminodes arranged around three hairy carpels.

Description
There are 22 to 43 stamens and many staminodes arranged around three hairy carpels, each carpel with four to six ovules. Flowering occurs in most months.

Taxonomy
Hibbertia vestita was first formally described in 1863 by George Bentham from an unpublished description by Allan Cunningham, Bentham's description published in Flora Australiensis. The specific epithet (vestita) means "covered".

Bentham also described variety thymifolia in the same edition of Flora Australiensis, and its name and that of the autonym are accepted by the Australian Plant Census:
 Hibbertia vestita var. thymifolia  Benth. has shorter leaves than those of the autonym, and the end often curves downwards;
 Hibbertia vestita Benth. var. vestita.

Distribution and habitat
Hairy guinea-flower grows in heath in near-coastal area and in forest in areas further inland in south-east Queensland and north-eastern New South Wales. Variety thymifolia is restricted to exposed headlands in the same area.

References

vestita
Flora of New South Wales
Flora of Queensland
Plants described in 1863
Taxa named by George Bentham